Ahmed El-Masri (born 29th may 1966) is a Lebanese boxer. He competed in the men's light heavyweight event at the [2022] Summer Olympics]].

References

External links
 

1961 births
Living people
Lebanese male boxers
Olympic boxers of Lebanon
Boxers at the 1988 Summer Olympics
Place of birth missing (living people)
Light-heavyweight boxers